Alexander William Stanaway (14 July 1886 – 27 June 1972), also known as Ariki Haira, was a New Zealand rugby league player who represented New Zealand. His brother, Jack Stanaway, was also a professional rugby league footballer and international referee.

Playing career
Stanaway toured Australia in 1908 with the first New Zealand Māori rugby league team. He again toured Australia in 1909 with a New Zealand Māori side.

Also in 1909, Stanaway played for the new City Rovers club in the Auckland Rugby League competition and represented Auckland.

In 1910, the Great Britain Lions toured New Zealand. Stanaway played for Auckland against the Lions.

In 1911, Stanaway was selected to represent New Zealand in their tour of Australia. No test matches were played on the tour.

In 1912 Stanaway played for the Auckland side that lost to New Zealand 16-38.

Later years
In 1916, Stanaway was called up to serve in the New Zealand Expeditionary Force.

He died on 27 June 1972.

References

New Zealand rugby league players
New Zealand national rugby league team players
Auckland rugby league team players
1886 births
New Zealand Māori rugby league team players
Rugby league props
City Rovers players
1972 deaths
New Zealand Army personnel
New Zealand military personnel of World War I